Lyudmila Alekseyevna Pakhomova (31 December 1946 – 17 May 1986) was a Russian ice dancer who competed for the Soviet Union. With her husband Alexandr Gorshkov, she was the 1976 Olympic champion, one of the oldest female figure skating Olympic champions.

They are six-time  World Champions (1970-74, 1976), as well as six-time European champions (1970-71, 1973-76), which makes them the most decorated of all-time at both events in the pair discipline.

Life and career 
Pakhomova was the daughter of Alexei Pakhomov, an aviation general. She began figure skating at age seven, when her grandmother brought her to Children and Youth Sports School by the Young Pioneers Stadium in Moscow. Her first ice dancing partner was the nine-years-older Viktor Ryzhkin, formerly her coach, with whom she trained at CSKA Moscow under Stanislav Zhuk. They won three Soviet national titles and placed 10th at the 1966 World Championships. They were the first Soviet ice dancers to compete at Worlds.

After her partnership with Ryzhkin ended, Pakhomova invited Alexandr Gorshkov to skate with her. He was only a couple of months older and also trained at CSKA Moscow. Since he had much less experience, some experts were skeptical of her choice. Despite the initial experience gap, Gorshkov said that Pakhomova was a strong personality who was determined they would become champions.

Pakhomova/Gorshkov began training in May 1966, under coach Elena Tchaikovskaya, and made their international debut in December of the same year. They competed for Dynamo. After teaming up, a personal relationship developed between the duo and Gorshkov proposed marriage; Pakhomova responded that they would marry only if they became World champions.

Pakhomova/Gorshkov performed in the ice dancing demonstration event at the 1968 Winter Olympics – the event determined if ice dancing would be added as an official Olympic sport and was successful. They won their first World title in 1970 and married later that year. The duo repeated as World champions in 1971, 1972, 1973, and 1974. In 1974, Pakhomova/Gorshkov and Tchaikovskaya created the Tango Romantica, which the ISU would later adopt as a compulsory dance.

Following the 1975 European Championships, Gorshkov began feeling ill and underwent a lung operation, with their coach Elena Tchaikovskaya donating blood. They flew to Colorado Springs, Colorado, U.S. for the 1975 World Championships, unsure about their participation. During the first practice session, Gorshkov had trouble breathing and needed to be given oxygen – they withdrew from the event. In the Soviet Union, rumors circulated that Gorshkov had died on the flight to the United States and the chairman of the Soviet Sports Committee called him to check if he was still alive.

Pakhomova/Gorshkov returned to competition the following season. Ice dancing debuted as an official Olympic sport at the 1976 Winter Olympics in Innsbruck, Austria, and Pakhomova/Gorshkov became the first Olympic champions in the discipline. They won their sixth World title in 1976 in Gothenburg, Sweden. They retired from competition later that year. In 1977, they had a daughter, Yulia Gorshkova.

Pakhomova began coaching at CSKA. Her students included 1980 and 1981 World Junior champions Elena Batanova / Alexei Soloviev and European medalists Natalia Annenko / Genrikh Sretenski. She coached Igor Shpilband for eight years (age 12 to 20). He and partner Tatiana Gladkova became the 1983 World Junior champions.

In late 1979, Pakhomova began having health problems which were eventually diagnosed as leukemia, but she continued to go out onto the ice even after her cancer made it very difficult. Her husband said she did not want to change anything in her life and it was not in her nature to give up. Pakhomova died at the age of 39 on 17 May 1986 and was interred in the Vagankovo Cemetery in Moscow.

A minor planet, 3231 Mila, discovered by Soviet astronomer Lyudmila Zhuravlyova in 1972, is named after her. Pakhomova was posthumously inducted into the World Figure Skating Hall of Fame in 1988, along with Gorshkov.

Programs 
Pakhomova and Gorshkov's programs included:
 La cumparsita
 Tango Romantica 
 Waltz from Masquerade by Aram Khachaturian
 1985: Swan Lake by Pyotr Ilyich Tchaikovsky; Shine, Shine, My Star (Гори, Гори, Моя Звезда); Mexican dance
 Ozornye Chastushki (Озорные частушки) by Rodion Shchedrin
 Vdol po Piterskoy (Вдоль по Питерской)
 The Nightingale (Соловей) and Svetit Mesyats (Светит месяц) by Alexander Alyabyev
 Works by Edvard Grieg and Stanisław Moniuszko

Results

With Gorshkov

With Ryzhkin

References

External links

Navigation

Russian female ice dancers
Soviet female ice dancers
Olympic figure skaters of the Soviet Union
Olympic gold medalists for the Soviet Union
Dynamo sports society athletes
Figure skaters at the 1976 Winter Olympics
Figure skaters from Moscow
1946 births
1986 deaths
Deaths from leukemia
Burials at Vagankovo Cemetery
Olympic medalists in figure skating
World Figure Skating Championships medalists
European Figure Skating Championships medalists
Russian figure skating coaches
Soviet figure skating coaches
Female sports coaches
Medalists at the 1976 Winter Olympics